Hazara District was a district of Peshawar Division in the North-West Frontier Province of Pakistan. It existed until 1976, when it was split into the districts of Abbottabad and Mansehra, with the new district of Haripur subsequently splitting off from Abbottabad, and Battagram and Torghar – from Mansehra.

The Imperial Gazetteer of India described the district as follows:
.

Current status
The Hazara District is now divided into Abbottabad, Mansehra and Haripur districts.

References

Districts of Khyber Pakhtunkhwa
Historic districts in Pakistan